There are 75 golf courses in Hawaii.

Oahu
Oahu has 37 golf clubs:

Public
Bay View G.C., Kaneohe (Par 60) – Open for night play weeknights
Coral Creek G.C.
Ewa Beach G.C.
Hawaii Country Club, Wahiawa
Hawaii Kai G.C. (Championship Course • Executive Course (9 hole Par 3)). Designed by William Bell and Robert Trent Jones, Sr.
Hawaii Prince G.C. (A Nines • B Nines • C Nines)
Kapolei G.C. – host to the Pacific Links Hawai'i Championship
Ke'alohi G.C., Hickam Course
Ko Olina G.C. – host to the LPGA Lotte Championship
Ko'olau G.C., Kaneohe
Makaha Valley Country Club, Mākaha Valley
Mililani G.C.
Olomana Golf Links
Pearl Country Club
Royal Hawaiian G.C., Kailua (formerly known as Luana Hills)
Royal Kunia Country Club, Waipahu
Waikele Country Club, Waipahu
Turtle Bay Resort (George Fazio Course • Arnold Palmer Course), Kahuku – host to the SBS Open at Turtle Bay and Turtle Bay Championship

Private
Barbers Point G.C.
Hoakalei Country Club At Ocean Pointe
Honolulu Country Club
Kaneohe Klipper Marine G.C.
Kalakaua G.C.
Leilehua G.C.
Mamala Bay G.C.
Mid Pacific Country Club
Moanalua G.C. (9 hole, semi-private) – First golf course in Hawaii, built in 1898.
Navy-Marine G.C.
Walter J. Nagorski G.C. (9 hole)
Oahu Country Club
Waialae Country Club – host to the Sony Open in Hawaii

Municipal
Ala Wai G.C., Waikiki 
Ewa Villages G.C.
Kahuku G.C., Kahuku. (9 hole) – The closest course on Oahu to a real links seaside layout
Pali Municipal G.C.
Ted Makalena G.C.
West Loch Municipal G.C.

Big Island
The island of Hawaii has 16 golf clubs:
Big Island Country Club, Kailua-Kona
Hamakua Country Club, Hamakua (9 Hole)
Hapuna G.C., Kohala Coast. Designed by Arnold Palmer and Ed Seay.
Hualālai G.C. (Hualālai course • Ke'olu course), Kailua-Kona Designed by Jack Nicklaus. – host to the Mitsubishi Electric Championship at Hualalai
Kona Country Club  (Mountain Course • Ocean Course), Kona
Makalei G.C., Kona
Mauna Kea G.C., Kohala Coast. Designed by Robert Trent Jones, Sr.
Mauna Lani Resort (North Course • South Course), Kohala Coast
Naniloa Country Club, Hilo (9 Hole)
Sea Mountain G.C. (closed), Pahala.
Volcano Golf and Country Club – Hawaii's highest course, situated at over 4,200 feet (adding 10-25 yards to every swing). Only a mile from Kilauea Volcano and Halemaʻumaʻu.
Waikoloa G.C. (Beach Course • Kings' Course), Waikoloa Beach. Designed by Robert Trent Jones, Jr. (1981).
Waikoloa Village G.C., Waikoloa Village. Designed by Robert Trent Jones, Jr.

Private
 Hokuli'a G.C., Kailua-Kona. Designed by Jack Nicklaus.
 Kukio G.C. (18-hole course • 10-hole course), Kailua-Kona. Designed by Tom Fazio.
 Nanea G.C., Kailua-Kona

Municipal
Hilo Municipal G.C., Hilo

Maui
The island of Maui has 10 golf clubs:
The Dunes at Maui Lani, Kahului
Elleair G.C., Kihei
Ka'anapali G.C. (Kai Course • Royal Course), Kaanapali. – host to the Wendy's Champions Skins Game
Kahili G.C., Wailuku
Kapalua G.C. (Bay Course • Plantation Course), Kapalua – host to the Hyundai Tournament of Champions
King Kamehameha G.C., Wailuku
Makena G.C., Wailea-Makena
Pukalani G.C., Pukalani
Wailea G.C. (Emerald Course • Gold Course • Blue Course), Wailea – former host to the LPGA Skins Game

Municipal
Waiehu Golf Course – hosted the USGA Amateur Links Championship in 1996

Kauai 

The island of Kauai has 8 golf clubs:
Kauai Lagoons G.C. (Kiele Mauka Nine / Kiele Moana Nine • Waikahe Nine)
Kiahuna G.C., Koloa
Kukuiolono G.C., (9 hole)
Makai G.C. at Princeville (Ocean & Lakes nines • Woods Course (9 hole)). Designed by Robert Trent Jones, Jr.
Poipu Bay Resort G.C., Poʻipū. Designed by Robert Trent Jones, Jr. – hosted the PGA Grand Slam of Golf from 1994-2006
Prince G.C. at Princeville, Hanalei. Designed by Robert Trent Jones, Jr.
Puakea G.C., Lihue

Municipal
Wailua G.C. – hosted the USGA Amateur Links Championship in 1975, 1985, 1996

Lanai 
The Challenge at Manele
The Experience at Koele
Cavendish G.C., Lanai City (9 hole) Par 36 course built in 1947 for sugar plantation workers. No green fee.

Molokai
Ironwood Hills G.C. (9 hole)

References

External links
Hawaii Golf Courses
Hawaii: Best In State Rankings, Travel Guide, Best Places To Play: Golf Digest
Book Tee Times in Hawaii

 
Hawaii, courses